Route 380 (also known as the Beothuck Trail) is a highway in Newfoundland and Labrador.  There are five communities along the route, beginning with South Brook at the Trans-Canada Highway (Route 1), and ending at the community of Brighton.  The route travels through three islands, including Pilley's Island and Brighton Tickle Island.  Triton is the most populous community along the route.

Route description

Route 380 begins on mainland Newfoundland in South Brook at an intersection with Route 1 (TCH) and heads north through town before leaving and heading northeast through very hilly terrain for several kilometres, where it has an intersection with Route 381 (Port Anson Road), which provides access to the communities on Sunday Cove Island. The highway now passes through Roberts Arm before crossing a Causeway onto Pilley's Island and passing through the Town of the same name, where it has an intersection with Route 382 (Long Island Tickle Road), which provides access to a ferry leading to Lushes Bight–Beaumont–Beaumont North (Long Island). Route 380 now crosses another causeway onto Big Triton Island and winds its way through the town of Triton before heading through hilly terrain to cross the final causeway onto Brighton Tickle Island, where it comes to an end in downtown Brighton.

Major intersections

References

380